The Rt Hon. Thomas Vesey, 1st Viscount de Vesci and 2nd Baron Knapton ( 1735 – 13 October 1804), was an Anglo-Irish peer.

Lord de Vesci was the son of the 1st Baron Knapton and Elizabeth Brownlow. He succeeded to his father's peerage on 25 June 1761 and assumed his seat in the Irish House of Lords. On 22 June 1776 he was made Viscount de Vesci, of Abbeyleix in the Queen's County, in the Peerage of Ireland.

On 24 September 1769, Lord Knapton, as he then was, married Elizabeth-Selina Brooke, the eldest daughter and co-heiress of Sir Arthur Brooke, 1st Baronet. Lord de Vesci was succeeded in his titles by his eldest son, John Vesey.

References

1730s births
Year of birth unknown
1804 deaths
18th-century Anglo-Irish people
Viscounts in the Peerage of Ireland
Members of the Irish House of Lords